Into the Lungs of Hell is the fifth album released by Dutch melodic death metal band, God Dethroned. It was released in 2003. This album marks the start of God Dethroned's switch to melodic death metal.

"Into the Lungs of Hell" is also the name of the instrumental first track of Megadeth's 1988 album, So Far, So Good... So What!

"Satan's Curse" is a cover of the Possessed song.

Track listing
"Into the Lungs of Hell"  – 5:13
"The Warcult"  – 4:15
"Enemy of the State"  – 3:16
"Soul Sweeper"  – 4:40
"Slaughtering the Faithful"  – 3:12
"Subliminal"  – 5:45
"The Tombstone"  – 4:50
"Gods of Terror"  – 6:02

Bonus Disc

"God Dethroned" (Re-Recorded Version)  – 6:21
"Satan's Curse"  – 4:18
"The Execution Protocol" (live)  – 4:11
"The Grand Grimoire" (live)  – 5:37
"Nocturnal" (live)  – 2:55
"Under a Silver Moon" (live)  – 6:25
"The Somberness of Winter" (live)  – 5:45
"Serpent King" (live)  – 6:08
"Villa Vampiria" (video clip) – 14:22
"Under the Golden Wings of Death" (video clip)

References

External links

2003 albums
God Dethroned albums
Metal Blade Records albums